The Yazoo City Zoos were a minor league baseball team based in Yazoo City, Mississippi between 1904 and 1912. The Yazoo City Zoos played as members of the Delta League in 1904 and the Cotton States League from 1910 to 1912.

History
The 1904 Yazoo City Zoos were the first minor league team based in Yazoo City. Playing the 1904 season under manager Harry Wilson, the Zoos were charter members of the Class D level Delta League. The Delta League League began the season with four charter league teams. The Brookhaven, MS (Brookhaven), Clarksdale, MS (Clarksdale), Jackson Senators and Yazoo City Zoos were the four charter members. On May 16, 1904, teams from Canton, MS (Canton) and Hattiesburg, MS (Hattiesburg) were added to the league after the season started.

The Yazoo City Zoos finished in 2nd place when the season ended on September 3, 1904. The final Delta League standings featured the 1st place Clarksdale team with a record of 67–31, finishing 4.0 games ahead of the 2nd place Yazoo City Zoos who had a record of 62–34. They were followed in the standings by Canton (43–45), the Jackson Senators (47–53), Hattiesburg (36–49) and Brookhaven (27–70) in the six–team league. The league did not have playoffs in 1904.

On June 13, 1904 in a Delta League game, Yahoo City was on the losing end of a no-hitter thrown by William Beeker of Clarksdale in a 6–0 Clarksdale victory.

It was reported that Yazoo City pitcher James Baxter Sparks set a professional baseball record by winning 21 consecutive games in 1904. It was noted that Sparks also threw a no-hitter against Clarksdale during the winning streak, with the game occurring on August 27, 1904 in a 1–0 Yazoo City victory.

The Delta League permanently folded after playing their only season in 1904. It is possible the league formed in 1905, but no teams or statistics are known for a 1905 Delta League season.

In 1910, the Yazoo city Zoos returned to minor league play, becoming members of the Class D level Cotton States League. With a 44–62 record, the team placed 4th in the six-team league under manager Walter Hickey. The 1910 team is referred to as the "ZuZus" in some references. Yazoo City finished 26.5 games behind the 1st place Greenwood Chauffers in the final standings.

The Yazoo City team continued Cotton States League play in 1911. With a 60–54 record, the Zoos placed 3rd under manager Dom Mullaney finishing 12.5 games behind the 1st place Vicksburg Hill Billies in the six–team league. The Yazoo City team folded from the Cotton States League after the 1911 season.
 
In their final season, the 1912 Yazoo City Zoos began the season without a team, then briefly returned to play before folding. On May 9, 1912, the New Orleans Little Pels of the Cotton States League moved to Yazoo City with a 14–9 record. On August 3, 1912, the team had a 27–45 record in Yazoo City and a 41–57 overall record under manager Gene DeMontreville when the franchise permanently disbanded, before the season had concluded.

Yazoo City, Mississippi has not hosted another minor league team.

The ballpark
The name of the Yazoo City home minor league ballpark is not directly referenced.

Timeline

Year-by-year record

Notable alumni
Harry Betts (1910–1911) 
Joe Martina (1911)
Moxie Meixell (1912)

See also
Yazoo City Zoos players

References

External links
Baseball Reference

Defunct minor league baseball teams
Defunct baseball teams in Mississippi
Baseball teams established in 1904
Baseball teams disestablished in 1912
Defunct Cotton States League teams
Delta League teams
Yazoo County, Mississippi
1904 establishments in Mississippi
1912 disestablishments in Mississippi